The Thomas Bitley House is a historic house located at Jerusalem in Yates County, New York.

Description and history 
It is an Italianate-style dwelling built in about 1855.

It was listed on the National Register of Historic Places on August 24, 1994.

References

Houses on the National Register of Historic Places in New York (state)
Italianate architecture in New York (state)
Houses completed in 1855
Houses in Yates County, New York
National Register of Historic Places in Yates County, New York